The Emu Bay Railway 11 class were a class of diesel-hydraulic locomotives built by Walkers Limited, Maryborough for the Emu Bay Railway between 1969 and 1971.

History
Between 1969 and 1971, the Emu Bay Railway took delivery of seven diesel-hydraulic locomotives from Walkers Limited. All were included in the April 1998 sale of the Emu Bay Railway to the Australian Transport Network. Following the cessation of vacuum braked trains in March 2002 they were withdrawn and sold to Queensland operators.

Status table

References

B-B locomotives
Diesel-hydraulic locomotives of Australia
Diesel locomotives of Tasmania
Railway locomotives introduced in 1969
Walkers Limited locomotives
3 ft 6 in gauge locomotives of Australia